Nancy Holmes (born February 9, 1959) is a Canadian poet and educator.

Biography
Holmes was born in Edmonton and went to high school in Toronto.  She then attended the University of Calgary where she received her MA in English.

She has published four collections of poetry and many short stories. Her poetry and fiction have been published in A Room of One's Own, Lichen, The Malahat Review, Matrix, Prairie Fire, Grain, The Harpweaver, and The Antigonish Review.  Holmes is an Associate Professor of English and Creative Writing at the University of British Columbia Okanagan.

Works
Valancy and the New World (Kalamalka Press, 1988)
Down to the Golden Chersonese: Victorian Lady Travellers (Sono Nis, 1991)
The Adultery Poems (Ronsdale, 2002)
Mandorla (Ronsdale Press, 2005)
Open Wide a Wilderness: Canadian Nature Poems (2008)
The Flicker Tree: Okanagan Poems (2012)
Arborophobia (University of Alberta Press, 2022)

References

External links
Author web site
  Nancy Holmes biography
 The Adultery Poems
 Interview with Nancy Holmes
 Helping Community
 Random Acts of Poetry

Academic staff of the University of British Columbia Okanagan
Living people
1959 births
Canadian women poets
20th-century Canadian poets
21st-century Canadian poets
Writers from British Columbia
Writers from Edmonton
20th-century Canadian women writers
21st-century Canadian women writers